Fernando Fernández Gómez (28 August 1921 – 21 November 2007) better known as Fernando Fernán Gómez was a Spanish actor, screenwriter, film director, theater director and member of the  Royal Spanish Academy for seven years. He was born in Peru while his mother, Spanish actress Carola Fernán-Gómez, was making a tour in Latin America. He would later use her surname for his stage name when he moved to Spain in 1924.

Biography
The most probable thing, as he wrote in his memoirs, is that he was born in Lima on 28 August 1921, even if his birth certificate indicates that he was born in the Argentine capital, Buenos Aires. The reason for this is that his mother, the theater actress Carola Fernán Gómez, was touring South America when he was born in Lima, so his birth certificate was issued days later in Argentina, a country whose nationality he retained, in addition to Spanish nationality, which was granted to him in 1984. Being an extramarital son, his father was also the actor Fernando Díaz de Mendoza y Guerrero, whose mother, María Guerrero, prevented the marriage between Fernando Fernán Gómez's parents.

After the Spanish Civil War he began to study law but interrupted his studies to work in theater. In 1942 he began to act in movies but also continued working on plays. He formed his own theater company and received awards for directing and writing. In the 1950s he began to direct movies, including the film of his novel, El viaje a ninguna partewhich explores the pueblo as a meeting place of national motifes. 
He received praise for his 1958 comedy La vida por delante, which led to a sequel, La vida alrededor. In 1977, he won the Silver Bear for Best Actor at the 27th Berlin International Film Festival for his role in The Anchorite. He won the award again at the 35th Berlin International Film Festival in 1985 for his role in Stico and finally the Honorary Golden Bear at the 55th Berlin International Film Festival in 2005.

Having been very much in demand during the 1970s and 1980s, the 1990s was a less active period for him, but towards the end of his life, he enjoyed something of a revival, featuring in three major projects: "Todo sobre mi madre", "Plenilunio", and a starring role in the hit "La lengua de las mariposas".

He married María Dolores Pradera in 1945; they divorced in 1959.  He married Emma Cohen in 2000. 

Fernando Fernán Gómez died in Madrid on 21 November 2007 from a heart failure aggravated by pneumonia and colon cancer. On 19 November 2007, he was admitted to the Oncology area of the Madrid University Hospital La Paz to be treated for pneumonia. After the President of the Government José Luis Rodríguez Zapatero announced the death of the actor, the Government of Spain posthumously awarded Fernán Gómez the Grand Cross of the Civil Order of Alfonso X, the Wise on 23 November. The mayor of Madrid, Alberto Ruiz-Gallardón, also announced that the Cultural Center of the Villa de Madrid would be renamed the Fernando Fernán Gómez Theater. As he was a lifelong anarchist, his coffin was covered in a black and red anarchist flag and was later cremated in the Almudena Cemetery in Madrid.

Filmography

Writer and Director

Actor

Rosas de otoño (1943, directed by Juan de Orduña and Eduardo Morera)
Cristina Guzmán (1943, directed by Gonzalo Delgrás) as Bob
Noche fantástica (1943, directed by Luis Marquina) as Enamorado
La chica del gato (1943, directed by Ramón Quadreny) as Paco
Viviendo al revés (1943, directed by Ignacio F. Iquino)
Turbante blanco (1943, directed by Ignacio F. Iquino)
A Palace for Sale (1943, directed by Ladislao Vajda)
Fin de curso (1943, directed by Ignacio F. Iquino) as himself (uncredited)
Una chica de opereta (1944, directed by Ramón Quadreny) as Salvador Viana
Mi enemigo y yo (1944, directed by Ramón Quadreny) as Antonio Aguilar 'Tony'
Empezó en boda (1944, directed by Raffaello Matarazzo)
El destino se disculpa (1945, directed by José Luis Sáenz de Heredia) as Teófilo Dueñas
The Road to Babel (1945, directed by Jerónimo Mihura) as Marcelino Pastor
Espronceda (1945, directed by Fernando Alonso Casares)
Bambú (1945, directed by José Luis Sáenz de Heredia) as Antonio
Domingo de carnaval (1945, directed by Edgar Neville) as Matías
Se le fue el novio (1945, directed by Julio Salvador) as Miguel Novak
Es peligroso asomarse al exterior (1946, directed by Alejandro Ulloa, Arthur Duarte) as Silvio
Eres un caso (1946, directed by Ramón Quadreny)
Los habitantes de la casa deshabitada (1946, directed by Gonzalo Delgrás) as Gregorio
Noche sin cielo (1947, directed by Ignacio F. Iquino) as Emilio
Botón de ancla (1948, directed by Ramón Torrado) as Enrique Tejada y Sandoval
Embrujo (1948, directed by Carlos Serrano de Osma) as Mentor
La muralla feliz (1948, directed by Enrique Herreros) as Don Fulgencio Ríos
The Black Siren (1948, directed by Carlos Serrano de Osma) as Gaspar de Montenegro
La próxima vez que vivamos (1948, directed by Enrique Gómez) as Pablo
Pototo, Boliche y compañía (1948, directed by Ramón Barreiro)
Hoy no pasamos lista (1948, directed by Raúl Alfonso, Rafael Alonso) as Don Manuel
Encrucijada (1948, Short, directed by Pedro Lazaga)
La mies es mucha (1949, directed by José Luis Sáenz de Heredia) as Padre Santiago Hernández
Vida en sombras (1949, directed by Lorenzo Llobet Gracia) as Carlos
Saturday Night (1949, directed by Rafael Gil) as Carlos
Rosas de otoño (1949, directed by Eduardo Morera and Juan de Orduña) as Adolfo Barona
Wings of Youth (1949, directed by Antonio del Amo) as Rodrigo
Ninety Minutes (1950, directed by Antonio del Amo) as Sr. Marchand
Tiempos felices (1950, directed by Enrique Gómez)
El último caballo (1950, directed by Edgar Neville) as Fernando
La noche del sábado (1950, directed by Rafael Gil) as Director de orquesta (uncredited)
Balarrasa (1951, directed by José Antonio Nieves Conde) as Javier Mendoza 'Balarrasa'
I Want to Marry You (1951, directed by Jerónimo Mihura) as Ramón
La trinca del aire (1951, directed by Ramón Torrado) as Zanahoria
Captain Poison (1951, directed by Luis Marquina) as Jorge de Córdoba
The Pelegrín System (1952, directed by Ignacio F. Iquino) as Héctor Pelegrín
Facultad de letras (1952, directed by Pío Ballesteros) as Fernando
The Eyes Leave a Trace (1952, directed by José Luis Sáenz de Heredia) as Agente Díaz
Cincuenta años del Real Madrid (1952, directed by Rafael Gil) as himself
La voce del silenzio (1953, directed by Georg Wilhelm Pabst) as Fernando Layer - assistente spirituale
Esa pareja feliz (1953, directed by Juan Antonio Bardem, Luis García Berlanga) as Juan Granados Muñoz
Airport (1953, directed by Luis Lucia Mingarro) as Luis
Nadie lo sabrá (1953, directed by Ramón Torrado) as Pedro Gutiérrez
Manicomio (1953, directed by Fernando Fernán Gómez, Luis María Delgado) as Carlos
Rebellion (1954, directed by José Antonio Nieves Conde) as Federico Lanuza
El mensaje (1954)
Morena Clara (1954, directed by Luis Lucia Mingarro) as Ramsés 45 / Don Lope de Baena y Carrasco / Don Enrique de Baena Rodríguez
The Other Life of Captain Contreras (1955, directed by Rafael Gil) as Alonso Contreras
El guardián del paraíso (1955, directed by Arturo Ruiz Castillo) as Manuel
Congress in Seville (1955, directed by Antonio Román) as Dr. Guillermo Kroll
Lo scapolo (El soltero) (1955, directed by Antonio Pietrangeli) as Armando
La gran mentira (1956, directed by Rafael Gil) as Fernando Fernán Gómez (uncredited)
El fenómeno (1956, directed by José María Elorrieta) as Claudio Henkel
Viaje de novios (1956, directed by León Klimovsky) as Juan Torregrosa Orózco
El malvado Carabel (1956) as Amaro Carabel
La ironía del dinero (1957, directed by Edgar Neville and Guy Lefranc) as Frasquito (segment "Sevilla")
Un marido de ida y vuelta (1957, directed by Luis Lucia Mingarro) as Ramírez (uncredited)
Faustina (1957, directed by José Luis Sáenz de Heredia) as Mogon
Un marido de ida y vuelta (1957) as Pepe López Garcerán
Los ángeles del volante (1957, directed by Ignacio F. Iquino) as Juanito
Las muchachas de azul (1957, directed by Pedro Lazaga) as Juan Ferrandis
The Tenant (1958, directed by José Antonio Nieves Conde) as Evaristo González
La vida por delante (1958, directed by Fernando Fernán Gómez and José Luis de la Torre) as Antonio Redondo
Ana dice sí (1958, directed by Pedro Lazaga) as Juan
Luna de verano (1959, directed by Pedro Lazaga) as Juan
Soledad (1959, directed by Mario Craveri, Enrico Gras as Félix Acaso) as Manuel
Bombas para la paz (1959, directed by Antonio Román) as Alfredo
La vida alrededor (1959) as Antonio Redondo
Crimen para recién casados (1960, directed by Pedro Luis Ramírez) as Antonio Menéndez
Les Trois etc. du Colonel (Los tres etc. del coronel) (1960, directed by Claude Boissol) as Le guérillo Lorenzo
Sólo para hombres (1960) as Pablo Meléndez
Adiós, Mimí Pompón (1961, directed by Luis Marquina) as Heriberto Promenade
La vida privada de Fulano de Tal (1961, directed by José María Forn)
Fantasmas en la casa (1961, directed by Pedro Luis Ramírez)
La venganza de Don Mendo (1962) as Don Mendo Salazar - Marqués de Cabra
¿Dónde pongo este muerto? (1962, directed by Pedro Luis Ramírez) as Manuel Carrasco
La becerrada (1963, directed by José María Forqué) as Francisco Rodríguez 'Juncal'
 (1963, directed by Jesús Franco) as Sargento Detective Miguel Mora
Benigno, hermano mío (1963, directed by Arturo González hijo)
El mundo sigue (1965) as Faustino
Un vampiro para dos (1965, directed by Pedro Lazaga) as Baron de Rosenthal
Ninette y un señor de Murcia (1966) as Andrés Martínez Segura
La Mujer de tu prójimo (1966, directed by Enrique Carreras)
Mayores con reparos (1966) as Fernando / Miguel / Manuel
La vil seducción (1968, directed by José María Forqué) as Ismael Bolante
Carola de día, Carola de noche (1969, directed by Jaime de Armiñán) as Hombre del motocarro
Un adulterio decente (1969, directed by Rafael Gil) as Dr. Leopoldo Cumberri
Estudio amueblado 2.P. (1969, directed by José María Forqué) as Miguel Aguirrezabala
Las panteras se comen a los ricos (1969, directed by Ramón Fernández) as José
De profesión, sus labores (1970, directed by Javier Aguirre) as Federico
¿Por qué pecamos a los cuarenta? (1970, directed by Pedro Lazaga) as Dr. Alejandro Quesada
Crimen imperfecto (1970) as Salomón
Growing Leg, Diminishing Skirt (1970, directed by Javier Aguirre) as Amadeo - Duque de Daroca
Cómo casarse en 7 días (1971) (uncredited)
Las Ibéricas F.C. (1971, directed by Pedro Masó) as Federico
Los gallos de la madrugada (1971, directed by José Luis Sáenz de Heredia) as Afilador
El triangulito (1972, directed by José María Forqué) as Lázaro López
Don Quijote cabalga de nuevo (1973, directed by Roberto Gavaldón) as Don Quijote / Alonso Quixano
La leyenda del alcalde de Zalamea (1973, directed by Mario Camus) as Don Lope
Ana y los lobos (1973, directed by Carlos Saura) as Fernando
The Spirit of the Beehive (1973, directed by Víctor Erice) as Fernando
Vera, un cuento cruel (1974, directed by Josefina Molina) as Roger
Yo la vi primero (1974) as Doctor
El amor del capitán Brando (1974, directed by Jaime de Armiñán) as Fernando
Pim, pam, pum... ¡fuego! (1975, directed by Pedro Olea) as Julio
Yo soy Fulana de Tal (1975, directed by Pedro Lazaga) as Rodolfo Pellejo
Jó, papá (1975, directed by Jaime de Armiñán) as Julio
Sensualidad (1975, directed by Germán Lorente) as Carlos Baena
Imposible para una solterona (1976, directed by Rafael Romero Marchent) as Manuel
La querida (1976) as Eduardo
El anacoreta (1976, directed by Juan Estelrich) as Fernando Tobajas
Más fina que las gallinas (1977, directed by Jesús Yagüe) as Don Enrique
Parranda (1977, directed by Gonzalo Suárez) as Escribiente
Bruja, más que bruja (1977) as Tío Justino
Las cuatro novias de Augusto Pérez (1977, directed by José Jara) as Augusto Pérez
Gulliver (1977, directed by Alfonso Ungría) as Martín
Chely (1977, directed by Ramón Fernández) as Nicolás
Reina Zanahoria (1977, directed by Gonzalo Suárez) as J. J
La ragazza dal pigiama giallo (La chica del pijama amarillo) (1977, directed by Flavio Mogherini) as Forensics detective
Arriba Hazaña (1978, directed by José María Gutiérrez Santos) as Hermano Prefecto
Los restos del naufragio (1978, directed by Ricardo Franco)
Madrid al desnudo (1979, directed by Jacinto Molina) as Baltasar
Milagro en el circo (1979, directed by Alejandro Galindo) as Macario
Mamá cumple cien años (1979, directed by Carlos Saura) as Fernando
Cuentos eróticos (1980) as Don Enrique (segment "Tiempos rotos") (voice)
Yo qué sé (1980, Short, directed by Emma Cohen)
Maravillas (1981, directed by Manuel Gutiérrez Aragón) as Fernando
Apaga... y vámonos (1981, directed by Antonio Hernández) as Prof. Benjamín Rodero
127 millones libres de impuestos (1981, directed by Pedro Masó) as Félix
Copia cero (1982, directed by Eduardo Campoy) as Carlos
Bésame, tonta (1982, directed by Fernando González de Canales) as Director general
La colmena (1982, directed by Mario Camus)
Interior roig (Interior rojo) (1983, directed by Eugenio Anglada)
Soldados de plomo (1983, directed by José Sacristán) as Don Dimas
Juana la loca... de vez en cuando (1983, directed by José Ramón Larraz) as Sir Henry
Feroz (1984, directed by Manuel Gutiérrez Aragón) as Luis
Los Zancos (1984, directed by Carlos Saura) as Ángel
La noche más hermosa (1984, directed by Manuel Gutiérrez Aragón) as Luis
Stico (1985, directed by Jaime de Armiñán) as Don Leopoldo Contreras de Tejada
De hombre a hombre (1985, directed by Ramón Fernández) as Silvestre
Luces de bohemia (1985, directed by Miguel Ángel Díez) as Ministro
Réquiem por un campesino español (1985, directed by Francisco Betriú) as Don Valeriano
La corte de Faraón (1985, directed by José Luis García Sánchez) as Roque
Marbella, un golpe de cinco estrellas (1985, directed by Miguel Hermoso) as Germán
Pobre mariposa (1986, directed by Raúl de la Torre) as Exiliado español
Mambrú se fue a la guerra (1986) as Emiliano
El viaje a ninguna parte (1986) as Don Arturo
La mitad del cielo (1986, directed by Manuel Gutiérrez Aragón) as Don Pedro
Delirios de amor (1986, directed by Antonio González Vigil, Luis Eduardo Aute, Cristina Andreu and Félix Rotaeta)
Cara de acelga (1987, directed by José Sacristán) as Madariaga
Mi general (1987, directed by Jaime de Armiñán) as General Mario del Pozo
Moros y Cristianos (1987, directed by Luis García Berlanga) as Don Fernando
El gran Serafín (1987, directed by José María Ulloque) as Padre Bellot
Esquilache (1989, directed by Josefina Molina) as Esquilache
El río que nos lleva (1989, directed by Antonio del Real) as Don Ángel
El mar y el tiempo (1989) as Eusebio
Fuera de juego (1991) as Don Aníbal
El rey pasmado (1991, directed by Imanol Uribe) as Gran Inquisidor
Marcellino (Marcelino, pan y vino) (1991, directed by Luigi Comencini) as Il priore
Chechu y familia (1992, directed by Álvaro Sáenz de Heredia) as Don José
Belle Époque (1992, directed by Fernando Trueba) as Manolo
Cartas desde Huesca (1993, directed by Antonio Artero) as Mainar
Así en el cielo como en la tierra (1995, directed by José Luis Cuerda) as Dios Padre
El sueño de los héroes (1996, directed by Sergio Renán) as Taboada
Tranvía a la Malvarrosa (1996, directed by José Luis García Sánchez) as Catedrático
Pesadilla para un rico (1996) as Presidente
La hermana (1997, directed by Juan José Porto) as Don Julián
Pintadas (1997, directed by Juan Estelrich junior) as José
El abuelo (1998, directed by José Luis Garci) as Don Rodrigo de Arista Potestad
Todo sobre mi madre (1999, directed by Pedro Almodóvar) as Padre de Rosa
Pepe Guindo (1999, directed by Manuel Iborra)
Plenilunio (1999, directed by Imanol Uribe) as Padre Orduña
La lengua de las mariposas (1999, directed by José Luis Cuerda) as Don Gregorio
Voz (2000, directed by Javier Aguirre)
Visionarios (2001, Manuel Gutiérrez Aragón) as Gobernador
En la ciudad sin límites (2002, directed by Antonio Hernández) as Max
El embrujo de Shanghai (2002, directed by Fernando Trueba) as Capitán Blay
Variaciones 1/113 (2003) (voice)
Bibliofrenia (2003, directed by Marcos Moreno, 2003) as Profesor Arturo Fuentes
Tiovivo c. 1950 (2004, directed by José Luis Garci) as Tertuliano
¡Hay motivo! (2004, Various) as voz en el epílogo
Para que no me olvides (2005, directed by Patricia Ferreira) as Mateo
Pablo G. del Amo, un montador de ilusiones (2005, directed by Diego Galán) as himself
Medea 2 (2006) as Mensajero
Mia Sarah (2006, directed by Gustavo Ron) as Paul (final film role)

Television

Writer and Director

Actor

Plays by Fernando Fernán Gómez
Las bicicletas son para el verano (1978)

Literary work

Novels
El Vendedor de Naranjas Madrid, Tebas, 1961. Madrid, Espasa-Calpe, 1986.
El Viaje a Ninguna Parte Madrid, Debate, 1985.
El Mal Amor Barcelona, Planeta. Historic novel.
El Mar y El Tiempo Barcelona, Planeta, 1988.El Ascensor de Los Borrachos Madrid, Espasa-Calpe, 1993.La Cruz y el Lirio Dorado'' Madrid, Espasa-Calpe, 1998.

See also
 Café Gijón (Madrid)

References

External links
 
 Fernán Gómez: Writer, Movie-Maker, Anarchist

1921 births
2007 deaths
20th-century Spanish male actors
21st-century Spanish male actors
Spanish male film actors
Spanish film directors
Spanish male screenwriters
Spanish anarchists
Members of the Royal Spanish Academy
Best Supporting Actor Goya Award winners
Best Director Goya Award winners
Silver Bear for Best Actor winners
Honorary Golden Bear recipients
Anarchist writers
20th-century Spanish screenwriters
20th-century Spanish male writers
Deaths from pneumonia in Spain
Deaths from cancer in Spain
Deaths from colorectal cancer